The Lambert Acres Golf Club is a 27-hole golf course nestled in Maryville, Tennessee with magnificent views of the Great Smoky Mountains. The golf course contains 9,525 yards of rolling hills with slopes throughout the entire landscape. The course opened in 1965 and was designed by Ray Franklin and has since gained national attention for its scenic beauty and tough courses. The club currently has three different 9-hole courses which are named White, Orange, and Red. Each course has nine holes but are usually played two at a time. The club is owned by Leon Berrong and is currently managed by his son Nick.

University use 
Aside from being a public golf course the Lambert Acres Golf Course is currently used by the cross country teams at the University of Tennessee. The course has been the location for the Volunteers' team meets for over fifteen years mainly because of its natural beauty and close distance from campus. Over the past ten years the course has played host to the Tennessee Invitational nine times, the NCAA South Regional in 2002, 2006 and 2008, and hosted the 1998 SEC Championship meet.

Scorecard 

The par and yardage shown are the scores specifically for champ level, but if the golfer does not wish to attempt that level there is also a ladies and mens level which features different yardage compared to the champ level.

White

Orange

Red

See also 

Tennessee Volunteers
Golf
Golf course

References

External links 
 lambertacresgc.com – Home page of the Lambert Acres Golf Club.

Golf clubs and courses in Tennessee
Buildings and structures in Blount County, Tennessee